The Arbitrator may refer to:

 Arbitrator, a person chosen to resolve a dispute by way of arbitration
 The Arbitrator (Israeli TV series), a 2007 Israeli drama series
 The Arbitrator (Vietnamese TV series), a 2017 Vietnamese drama series